Alberto José Fanesi (born 16 February 1948 in Casilda, Santa Fe) is an Argentine footballer manager and former player. As a player, he won the Argentine championship with three teams.

Titles

Coaching career

He has coached at Gimnasia La Plata, Huracan, Vélez Sársfield, Quilmes and Unión de Mar del Plata.

References

External links
 Managerial statistics in Argentina
 Interview with La Nacion

1948 births
Living people
People from Casilda
Sportspeople from Santa Fe Province
Argentine footballers
Association football defenders
Argentine Primera División players
Rosario Central footballers
Club Atlético Huracán footballers
Quilmes Atlético Club footballers
Argentine football managers
Club de Gimnasia y Esgrima La Plata managers
Club Atlético Huracán managers
Quilmes Atlético Club managers
Club Atlético Vélez Sarsfield managers